Edward Harper (born April 9, 1931) is a former Canadian politician, who represented the electoral district of Simcoe Centre in the House of Commons of Canada from 1993 until 1997. A member of the Reform Party, Harper was the only MP from that party ever elected anywhere east of Manitoba.

He defeated Liberal candidate Janice Laking, the incumbent mayor of Barrie, by a margin of 123 votes. Political analysts credited his victory over Laking largely to her popularity rather than his, suggesting that many voters in Barrie switched their votes only because they didn't want Laking to step down as mayor.

Harper did not stand for reelection in the 1997 election. Before being elected to Parliament, Harper was a businessman in Barrie.

Electoral record

References

External links
 

1931 births
Living people
Members of the House of Commons of Canada from Ontario
People from Barrie
Politicians from Toronto
Reform Party of Canada MPs